Ichgam , also known as Ichigam, is a census town located in the Indian administered union territory of Jammu and Kashmir's Budgam district. It falls under the administrative division of  tehsil Budgam, one of the nine tehsils of district Budgam. It is one of the most populated area of Budgam district. Ichgam village consists of four blocks — Ichgam-A, Ichgam-B, Ichgam-C and Ichgam-D. The village consists of both major sects of Islam, Shias (85-90%) and Sunnis(10-15%). There is also a Hindu minority.

Demographics
, the population of Ichgam is 7,461 of which 3,820 are males while the remaining 3,641 are females as per the report released by Census of India. Population of children with age of 0-6 is 15.64% that's 1,167 of the total population of Ichgam. In Ichgam, the female sex ratio is of 953 against the erstwhile state average of 889. The child sex ratio in Ichgam village is around 1,065 compared to a previous state average of 862. Literacy rate of the Ichgam is 91.5% higher than the former state average of 67.16%. In Ichgam, male literacy is around 93% while female literacy rate is 90%.

Geography
The Srinagar International Airport is located near to the village Ichgam.

Education

Schools in Ichgam

Government Boys Higher Secondary School Ichgam
Government Boys Higher Secondary School Ichgam is located at the main bus stand of Ichgam, behind the newly built complex. Managed by the Department of Education, the school was established in the year 1930. The medium of instructions in this school is English. Government Boys Higher Secondary School is housed in the two government owned buildings. The UDISE code of the school is 01040900603. The school is co-educational and consists of the classes from nine (9th) to twelve (12th).

Imamia Public School Ichgam
Imamia Public School (IPS) Ichgam is managed and run by Educational Trust Kashmir (ETK), the organization that runs many schools in the Kashmir valley named, Imamia Public Schools. The school was established in 1989 and is located at the Kalbal, the North western part of the town; behind the Primary Health Center Ichgam. Its UDISE code is 01040900606. At present, nearly 400 above students are studying in this school. Imamia Public School is housed in the Educational Trust Kashmir owned, big three floor building. The school is among the best schools of the village Ichgam and the in the near localities.

Others 
 Government Girls High School Ichgam
 Government Middle School Ichgam
 Government School Wolina, Ichgam
 Government School Baghat Mohalla, Ichgam
 Government School Naru, Ichgam
 IEI Ichgam
 Hasnain Educational Institute, Ichgam

Healthcare System

As of December 2020, there are numerous Medical shops and stores present in the village of Ichgam. The Primary Health Centre Ichgam is located at Kalbal,  the north-western part of Ichgam.

Attractions 
The shrine of Haztat Abbas  is located in Bungam area of the village Ichgam. It is also called Roza Hazrat Abul Fazel Abbass in the native language of the village. Every Thursday, a large number of people from the Shia sect of Islam visit here. It is one of the biggest landmark in the village.

Sports
Cricket, football, and badminton are the most played sports in Ichgam. Cricket, being the most popular sport in India, is also played on a large scale in Ichgam. In brick kilns, on playgrounds; anywhere we can see the children and adults of Ichgam playing cricket in mid summer. Tournaments are organized and people take a part in them  by spectating, cheering or by directly participating in them.

Transport

Roads 
Ichgam town falls on Budgam- Khansahib road. It is connected to many other villages and townships by a network of roads. To link  Ichgam  with Ompora, Zori Bhag, Qazi Bagh and Budgam internally, a new link road is being built by the government. This link will be completed by 2021 and will reduce distance between these places.

Roads in the Ichgam village are Macadamized but still some roads are not properly built. In ending 2020, some roads near Roza Hazrat Abbass (as) were Mecadamized.

Railway 
To present date, there is no railway line connecting Ichgam with other places.

Airport 
The nearest airport to Ichgam is Srinagar International Airport, also called  Budgam Airbase.

Old suffering 
Prior to December 2020, the villagers of Ichgam used to face a routinely problem. The Airforce Base Camp is located next to the Sheikh ul-Alam International Airport . The gunshots that came from this camp used to hit many houses in Wolina, a part of Ichgam. On 11 December 2020, a female inhabitant (Fatima Begum) was hit by the bullet in her right leg while she was washing vegetables in her kitchen. The bullet had pierced the roof of her house and had been fired by the Airforce personnel during their routine firing drills. It was the daily routine of the air force personnel to conduct their firing drill in the same direction as of the Wolina area of the village. This had put the lives of villagers at the risk of death. Even after reaching many officials, nobody seemed to care about the ordeals of villagers.

The injury of Fatima sparked off a protest in Ichgam. Many people (men and women) blocked the Budgam-Khansahib and Budgam-Chadoora road demanding a quick action against Air force personnel who are involved in the incident. Many officials including Deputy Commissioner Budgam, SHO Budgam and the Tehsildar also visited the place after and during the protests.

Later on an FIR was filed by the Police Station Budgam and the routine of firing drill was closed by the administration.

Telecom services 
The Ichgam village is connected through telecom services to the entire world. Airtel, Bsnl, Vodafone, and Reliance Jio are the main telecom service providers in this area. On 21 February 2018, Aircel stopped its services in the whole country. The local subscribers also affected in this village.

See also
 Dooniwari
 Budgam
 Srinagar
  Budgam Airbase
 Chadoora
 Khansahib

Notes

References

External links

 Vale of Kashmir
 Official Website of Budgam District
 

Villages in Budgam district